The Sabah Art Gallery (BSLS) is an art gallery in Kota Kinabalu, Sabah, Malaysia.

History 
The art gallery was founded in 1984 by Datuk Mohd. Yaman Hj. Ahmad Mus. In 2012, it was certified as green building by Green Building Index Accreditation Panel. On 9 November 2013, Sabah Chief Minister Musa Aman officiated the conservation centre building of the art gallery in conjunction with the 50th anniversary of Sabah accession into the federation of Malaysia.

Architecture 
The art gallery building is located on a 1.7 hectares of land with an octagonal basket-shaped building. It was constructed with a cost of MYR16 million.

Exhibitions 
The building consists of two gallery spaces. The permanent exhibition of the art gallery houses more than 3,000 art works by local and international artists with a total estimated value of around more than MYR10 million. The temporary gallery houses various exhibitions.

Events 
Besides exhibitions, the gallery regularly hosts workshops, seminars, competitions etc.

See also 
 List of tourist attractions in Malaysia

References

External links 

1984 establishments in Malaysia
Art museums and galleries in Sabah
Buildings and structures in Kota Kinabalu